Skinner v. Railway Labor Executives Association, 489 U.S. 602 (1989), was the U.S. Supreme Court case that paved the way for random drug testing of public employees in "safety sensitive" positions.

Background
In the mid-1980s, the Federal Railroad Administration (FRA) issued regulations to adopt safety standards for the railroad industry. Included in these regulations were mandatory blood and urine tests of employees involved in train accidents, to determine if they were using illegal narcotics. The FRA also adopted regulations that authorized railroads to administer breath and urine drug tests to employees who violated safety rules. The Railway Labor Executives' Association, an umbrella group of railway trade unions, sued to have the regulations declared an unconstitutional violation of the Fourth Amendment to the United States Constitution.

Decision
At face value, random drug testing appears to be a violation of the Fourth Amendment, which protects the right of citizens "to be secure in their persons, houses, papers, and effects, against unreasonable searches and seizures." In addition, the Fourth Amendment states that "no Warrants shall issue, but upon probable cause, supported by Oath or affirmation, and particularly describing the place to be searched, and the persons or things to be seized." However, the United States Supreme Court ruled in Skinner that random drug testing is permissible for employees in safety sensitive positions. Justice Kennedy, speaking for the majority, wrote:

The dissenting opinion by Justices Marshall and Brennan illustrates the other side of the controversy:

Special Needs Doctrine
The United States Foreign Intelligence Surveillance Court (FISA court) has used this ruling to expand the "special needs doctrine" that carves out an exception to the Fourth Amendment for the broad collection and examination of Americans' data to track possible terrorists.

See also
 List of United States Supreme Court cases, volume 489
 List of United States Supreme Court cases
 Lists of United States Supreme Court cases by volume
 List of United States Supreme Court cases by the Rehnquist Court
National Treasury Employees Union v. Von Raab (1989)
Railway Labor Executives' Association v. Gibbons (1982)

Further reading

References

External links
 

United States Supreme Court cases
United States Supreme Court cases of the Rehnquist Court
United States controlled substances case law
United States Fourth Amendment case law
United States labor case law
1989 in United States case law
Drug testing
Railway safety